Brain Bar is an annual event held in Budapest, Hungary. It has been referred to as "a sort of South By Southwest on the Danube" as it is both a tech conference and a music festival. The event attracted more than 15,000 attendees in 2019 and a livestream audience of more than 50,000.

Brain Bar's audience is allowed to communicate with the speakers. The festival hosts roundtable talks and debates that set up opposing viewpoints against each other, and talks challenging commonly held beliefs.

History
Brain Bar was founded by Gergely Böszörményi-Nagy with the goal of creating a platform concerned mostly with future studies. The event grapples with future scenarios in the areas of technology, business, politics and lifestyle. Brain Bar features multiple on-stage debate formats meant to encourage audience members' participation and challenge conventional thinking. Accompanying keynote presentations and debates, the festival also has artistic performances including DJ sets, live music and dance as an integral part of the program.

Brain Bar has featured figures including Canadian psychologist Jordan B. Peterson, model and dietitian Maye Musk, PayPal co-founder Peter Thiel, restaurateur Massimo Bottura, EU Commissioner for Competition Margrethe Vestager, sci-fi author Ted Chiang, Google Vice President Jacquelline Fuller, former President of Estonia Toomas Hendrik Ilves, retired astronaut Chris Hadfield, paleontologist Jack Horner, criminal law professor Gabriel Hallevy, co-founder of Pirate Bay Peter Sunde and robot Sophia.

Brain Bar formed a strategic partnerships with Deloitte, BMW, Vodafone, OTP, Bosch, MOL and WIRED as its media partner. Other sponsors include Google, E.ON and BlackRock.

In previous years the festival has included moderators from Forbes, the Financial Times and Politico Europe.

Educational outreach
Each year, a large number of tickets are given away to European students and teachers: in 2019, 5,000 students and teachers attended the festival free of charge. In 2017, organizers launched a new platform, Future Jobs, which offers specially selected future-proof jobs from the fields of communication, design, IT, services and business and gives "a unique opportunity for young people to learn what employers are looking for, to inform educators about the requirements of tomorrow, and to help employers learn more about today’s talent." In 2018, Brain Bar launched its business-focused workshops, Mastermind Sessions.

References

External links 
Official site

Technology conferences
Events in Budapest
Recurring events established in 2015
2015 establishments in Hungary
Summer events in Hungary